The Texas House of Representatives' 66th district represents a portion of Collin County, including parts of Plano and Dallas. The current Representative of this district is Matt Shaheen, a Republican from Plano who has represented the district since 2015.

Upon being moved to Collin County in 1993, district 66 became a suburban Republican stronghold; recently however, the district has become increasingly competitive, with Democrats coming within 1 percentage point of flipping the district in both 2018 and 2020.

As a result of the 2021 redistricting, the district will represent parts of Frisco, Plano, Prosper, and Celina.

Statewide election results 
Election results from recent statewide races:

List of representatives

Recent election results

References

66